Two ships of the Royal Navy have been named HMS Amaryllis :

  an  sloop launched in 1915 and sold in 1923
 HMS Amaryllis, a  cancelled before being laid down. Subsequently re-ordered as the  

Royal Navy ship names